On December 20, 1820, Jesse Slocumb (DR) of  died.  A special election was held to fill the resulting vacancy

Election results

Blackledge took office on February 7, 1821, near the end of the 16th Congress.  He was also elected to the 17th Congress.

See also
 List of special elections to the United States House of Representatives
 1820 and 1821 United States House of Representatives elections
 List of United States representatives from North Carolina

References

1821 04
North Carolina 1821 04
North Carolina 04
North Carolina 04
United States House of Representatives 04
United States House of Representatives 1821 04